Wing-Time, Inc. is a manufacturer of gourmet Buffalo Wing & Bar-B-Que sauces typically used for Buffalo wings. In 1994, Terry Brown started Wing-Time to bring his homemade sauces to market. Brown grew up in Upstate New York, the heart of wing country, where he learned the sauce skills necessary to produce a commercial product able to stand the test of time.

Based in the mountain town of Steamboat Springs, Colorado, Wing-Time sauces are shipped all over the country and exported to thousands of stores. These include specialty/gourmet stores, hot sauce shops, traditional grocery stores and department stores. Foodservice customers include high-volume wing eateries, restaurants, bar & grills and caterers. Wing-Time sauces can also be found in the military commissaries.

Wing-Time produces an all-natural and preservative free line of Buffalo Wing sauces.  All the sauces (exc. Bar-B-Que) are also sugar free, gluten free, and contain no MSG.  The entire line is available in 13 oz retail-sized bottles and 5-gallon pails for the food industry. There are easy-to-follow cooking instructions on how to make wings on every bottle.  There is also a gift pack that contains all six flavors.

Wing-Time sauces have won numerous awards at various food shows around the country since its inception in 1994.

Flavors
Mild with Parmesan
Medium
Hot
Garlic with Parmesan
Super Hot (with Habanero peppers)
Bar-B-Que

See also
Buffalo Wings

External links
 Official website

Companies based in Colorado
Condiment companies of the United States